Artemio Masweng Zabala (born 31 March 1935) is a retired Filipino Episcopalian bishop. He was the first Prime Bishop of the Episcopal Church in the Philippines, from 1989 to 1992. He was succeeded by Joel Pachao. Zabala serves currently as retired bishop in residence in the Episcopal Diocese of Los Angeles.

Zabala was the first Bishop of the Episcopal Diocese of North Central Philippines in February 1989. He resigned in 1992 to be the Church's missionary to the Diocese of Los Angeles, and was replaced by Joel A. Pachao in 1993.

Bibliography
F.D. Maurice: An Inquiry Into His Theological Method (Toronto School of Theology thesis, 1973)
 “Advent Reflections on Colossians 1:15–20 in the Philippine Setting,” Asian Journal of Theology 3 (1989): 316.

References

Brief History

1935 births
Living people
Filipino Episcopalians
Bishops of the Episcopal Church (United States)
20th-century Anglican bishops in Asia
Place of birth missing (living people)
Anglican bishops in the Philippines
Episcopal bishops of North Central Philippines
Filipino bishops
20th-century American clergy